"Smokin out the Window" is a song by American superduo Silk Sonic, consisting of Bruno Mars and Anderson .Paak. It was released on November 5, 2021, by Aftermath Entertainment and Atlantic Records as the third single from their debut studio album, An Evening with Silk Sonic (2021). The song was written by Mars, Brandon Anderson and Dernst Emile II, while the production was handled by Mars and D'Mile. A R&B, soul and funk song, it was inspired by music from the 1970s. The lyrics are humorous and describe how Silk Sonic's heart was broken by an unfaithful lover.

"Smokin out the Window" received mixed reviews by music critics, some of whom praised the duo's delivery, while others criticized its "playful" lyrics. The song reached the top five on the US Billboard Hot 100, peaked at number two on the Hot R&B/Hip-Hop Songs and was certified two times platinum by the Recording Industry Association of America (RIAA). Furthermore, it also reached the top ten in Australia, Canada, Israel, New Zealand and Singapore. It was certified platinum by Music Canada (MC).

The accompanying music video, was directed by Mars and John Esparza, being released along with the song. It depicts Mars and .Paak, as Silk Sonic, performing the song on "an old-school TV set". At one point, .Paak pretends to "drop dead mid-performance". To promote "Smokin out the Window", Mars and Paak performed it at the American Music Awards of 2021 and 2021 Soul Train Music Awards, attracting praise for the duo vocal's ability and comparisons to a 1970s Soul Train telecast. They also performed the song during their concert residency An Evening with Silk Sonic at Park MGM (2022). It won Video of the Year at the BET Awards 2022 and Video of the Year at the 2022 Soul Train Music Awards, whilst being nominated for Best Dance Performance.

Background
American singers Bruno Mars and Anderson .Paak met in 2017 while touring together on the European leg of Mars's 24K Magic World Tour (2017–18). The two were in the studio working with Nile Rodgers and Guy Lawrence of Disclosure. The studio session, which took place after spending a week together, had no intent, besides their mutual appreciation and affection. During the tour, one of them began saying the sentence "Smoking out the Window". They created an amusing "stressed-out" man smoking too many cigarettes as he tries to find his way out of "anxious" situations as part of a "bit". Mars furthered, "It was an idea we started four or five years ago on tour. It didn't sound nothing like it does now, but we just had the 'Smokin Out the Window' idea." Once the tour ended, the sessions were put on hold.

Nevertheless, in February 2020, before the COVID-19 pandemic in the United States, Mars was listening to what they had recorded, and "it hit the right chord" so he called .Paak on his birthday to join him in the studio. The former said, "Yo, I want to finish that song", to which .Paak replied, "I'm drunk! What do you mean? Come on!". Nevertheless, despite being drunk, he met Mars at the studio. During the song-making session .Paak kept claiming "I'm the king of R&B! Tell me I ain't the hottest in the game!" When they started to write the song, "a competitive" and friendly spirit emerged as they were trying to improve on the work. Once they finished the song .Paak said "I'm out, what we doing tomorrow?" According to Mars, it was the first song they wrote together.

Release and production 
On November 5, 2021, "Smokin out the Window" was released as the third single from An Evening with Silk Sonic via digital download and streaming services in various countries by Aftermath Entertainment and Atlantic Records. On the same date, Warner Music Group also issued the track for radio airplay in Italy. On November 8, 2021, the track was sent to American adult contemporary, hot adult contemporary and modern adult contemporary radio stations by Atlantic Records. A day later, "Smokin out the Window" was released to US contemporary hit radio through the aforementioned label. On January 28, 2022, a CD single, with the original version of the song was released in various countries.

"Smokin out the Window" was written by Mars, Paak and Dernst Emile II. The production was handled by Mars and D' Mile. The former played the guitar and was in charge of the percussion, while the latter played the bass and piano. Bootsy Collins vocals were recorded by Tobe Donohue at Rehab Studio in Cincinnati, Ohio. Homer Steinweiss played drums, while Ella Feingold was in charge of the vibraphone. The horn section had Kameron Whalum playing the trombone, Marc Franklin the trumpet, Kirk Smothers playing the alto and bari sax and Lannie McMillan the tenor sax. The horns were recorded by Boo Mitchell at Royal Studios in Memphis, Tennessee. The drums were recorded by Jens Jungkurth at The Legendary Diamond Mine, Long Island City, New York. Blake Espy, Emma Kummrow and Christopher Jusell played the violin with Natasha Colkett, Tess Varley and Luigi Mazzocchi, Jonathan Kim and Yoshihiko Nakano were responsible for the viola and Glenn Fischbach played the cello. Larry Gold did the arrangement and conduction of the strings at Milkboy Studios, Philadelphia, Pennsylvania, with Jeff Chestek recording the strings. Charles Moniz, with engineering assistant Alex Resoagli, engineered and recorded the song at Shampoo Press & Curl Studios. Serban Ghenea mixed "Leave the Door Open" at MixStar Studios in Virginia Beach, with John Hanes serving as the mix engineer and Bryce Bordone as mixing assistant. It was mastered by Randy Merrill at Sterling Sound, NYC.

Composition

Musically, "Smokin out the Window" is a R&B, soul and funk song. The song has been described as "buttery ballad", a "requisite breakup song" and "smooth". Jacob Uitti writing for American Songwriter affirmed the single draws inspiration from the 1970s sound. Uitti added that the Silk Sonic sing "about the realization that a lover is not being faithful and has many other men on the side." The lyrics are about men who have pampered a woman too much and she is not only using but also cheating on him, "instead of being a monogamous lover.". Paak croons as he recalls a former lover, "Just the other night she was gripping on me tight, screaming 'Hercules!'", "drawing out the melody over a weighty bassline."

Jon Dolan from Rolling Stone noticed the songs's "deceptively" title as it tells the story of a "stressed-out boyfriend" complaining not only about his girlfriend's "badass kids", but also "a jam with her ex-man in the UFC." Entertainment Weekly Leah Greenblatt said "Even Casanovas get the blues, though; "Smoking Out the Window" pines prettily for a girl who can't stop stepping out." According to Wongo Okon writing for Uproxx Silk Sonic show their "spite towards a former lover that walked out of them." The single "finds Bruno and .Paak venting about their former lovers' actions". Jon Pareles of The New York Times said the song is "bitter but still lovelorn song about a gold-digger ex."  Erika Marie from HotNewHipHop, affirmed that Silk Sonic is "dealing with women whose demands are stressing them out."

Ross Scarano from Pitchfork described the song as a "heartbroken lament". Billboard Jason Lipshutz tought it was "an amiable slow jam  with a slightly higher spring in its step than "Leave the Door Open". On the other hand, Elijah Watson of Okayplayer found similarities between the single and "Leave the Door Open" due to its "steady and downtempo groove." Watson explained that the track details a love that is over and finds Mars and .Paak "heartbroken and hurt". Watson furthered that the song might sound sad, but most of the lyrics are funny, with the various "scenarios the pair's lovers have put them in leaving them stressed out".

Critical reception
"Smokin out the Window" was met with mixed reviews from most music critics. Regina Cho writing for Revolt praised the duo, saying "the two bounce off of each other's energy perfectly as soon as the opening drums hit". Dolan stated that the track shows a "lovingly winking post-hip-hop playfulness". Devon Jefferson, for HipHopDX, found the song to be Silk Sonic's "new groove".  In a mixed review, Lipshutz completed Silk Sonic's "smooth move" with "Smokin Out The Window". Lipshutz also stated that despite Silk Sonic's new songs enhancing Mars and .Paak "solid-gold impulses, their chemistry now sounds like a foregone conclusion." Paste Candace McDuffie criticized the song's "playful lyricism that borders on parody", but affirmed that Silk Sonic "hyperbolic" delivery "saves" the track. In a negative review, Hot Press Pat Carty said the single "has its tongue so firmly in its cheek, it's poking clean through" and labeled it "as groovy as a country lane." Scarano didn't enjoyed the track, "this is a cartoon revival of a well-worn aesthetic".

Accolades
"Smokin out the Window" was listed by Billboard publication as being among the best songs of the year. The single was placed at number 63 on the Billboard 100 Best Songs of 2021. Rania Aniftos wrote "the success of "Smokin out the Window" can be attributed to the fact that Silk Sonic can make calling a woman "this b—h" weirdly attractive". Vibe staff placed "Smokin out the Window" among "picks for the songs you should check out" on November 5, 2021, with Mya Abraham describing it as a "hilarious jam...and it's just perfect. The song is a hoot". The song was also included on Under the Radar Songs of the Week on November 5, 2021; Redfern said, "Smoking Out the Window is another winning and smooth retro '70s soul cut featuring amusing lyrics". "Smokin out the Window" received a nomination for Favorite R&B Song at the American Music Awards of 2022. At the 2023 iHeartRadio Music Awards the single was nominated for R&B Song of the Year.

Commercial performance
"Smokin out the Window" debuted at number eight on the US Billboard Hot 100 with 21 million streams, 5.9 million radio impressions, and 9,300 downloads on its first tracking week. On the following week, the single peaked at number five on the Billboard Hot 100 with 23.8 million streams and 13.7 million in airplay audience. The song debuted at its peak of number two on the Billboard Hot R&B/Hip-Hop Songs chart and eventually topped the Rhythmic chart. It was certified two-times platinum by the Recording Industry Association of America (RIAA). "Smokin out the Window" rose to number 10 on the Canadian Hot 100 chart, having started at number 23 on November 29, 2021. It was certified platinum by Music Canada (MC).

In Israel, "Smokin out the Window" peaked at number five on the week of December 19, 2021. On the New Zealand Singles Chart, the song debuted at number ten on November 15, 2021, and peaked at number four the following week. It was certified gold by Recorded Music NZ (RMNZ). In Australia, the song entered at number 34 on November 21, 2011 and peaked at number eight on the ARIA Singles Chart the next week. The single peaked at number 11 in Denmark and Ireland. In the United Kingdom, the song peaked at number 12 on the UK Singles Chart. The track debuted at number 53 on the Portuguese Singles Chart and peaked at number 15. "Smokin out the Window" peaked at number eight on the Billboard Global 200.

Music video

On November 1, 2021, Silk Sonic teased their fans by tweeting out a muted clip of an alternate music video, showing the duo driving as they sing the vocals, all the while smoking and eating pizza. However, the clip lip-synced the second chorus of the song. The official music video for "Smokin out the Window" was released alongside the song on November 5, 2021, and was directed by Mars and John Esparza.

In the retro 70's retro "stylized like a vintage television performance" music video, the duo is wearing wide "old-school" lapel tuxedo jackets. They perform a choreography on an old-school TV set, in which the stage is decorated with large light-up stars, alongside backup singers and a band. During their performance .Paak and Mars are singing and smoking cigarettes. At one point, the former pretends to "drop dead mid-performance".

Cho praised the duo saying they showcased their "performance skills". Watson affirmed the duo looks "incredibly dapper". The music video for "Smokin out the Window" won Video of the Year at the BET Awards 2022, in a tie with Baby Keem and Kendrick Lamar's "Family Ties" (2021). It also won Video of the Year, whilst being nominated for Best Dance Performance at the 2022 Soul Train Music Awards.

Live performances and other usage
On November 21, 2021, "Smokin out the Window" was performed live for the first time, as the opening act of the American Music Awards of 2021. Silk Sonic wore velvet red-suits and sunglasses as they performed alongside their live band, which included "backing vocalists, a trumpet player, and saxophonist." The act drew inspiration from the 1970s, including the "retro dance moves, glowing stage lights, big sunglasses" and "the hints of chest hair." David Renshaw, writing for The Fader, considered Sonic's act one of the best of the show, as they opened the ceremony "in smooth fashion". Curto thought Silk Sonic's performance was one of the highlights of the ceremony. Curto complements the duo's "vocal runs" and their "silky smoothness" to open the American Music Awards. Billboard Carl Lamarre praised the duo's "velvety smooth vocal" and their "shifty footwork". ET Canada wrote that Silk Sonic demonstrated "swagger and flawless vocals", as well as "set the bar high for the rest of tonight's performers". Ryan Reed from Rolling Stone called the performance "ultra-smooth".

A week later, Silk Sonic, opened the 2021 Soul Train Music Awards, held at the Apollo Theater in New York, with two pre-recorded performances. The first "Fly as Me", and the second, which closed the show, "Smokin out the Window". Regarding the latter, the duo decided to pay "homage to Soul Train's height" and performed with the "iconic Soul Train backdrop", restating "the set of the old TV show." Silk Sonic wore "white blazers, white shirts and black slacks" as they performed alongside their live band. Vulture Bethy Squires found the set to be "lovingly redon" and called it "gorgeous". Prezzy Brown Vibe found the duo "controlling the crowd and taking ownership of the stage". Debbie Carr writing for NME dubbed their act "grin-inducing" and "vintage-influenced". Mars and .Paak also performed the song during their concert residency An Evening With Silk Sonic at Park MGM (2022).

Personnel
Credits adapted from the liner notes of An Evening with Silk Sonic.

Bruno Mars – vocals, songwriting, production, guitar, percussion
Anderson .Paak – vocals, songwriting
Bootsy Collins – vocals
D'Mile – songwriting, production, bass, piano
Homer Steinweiss – drums
Ella Feingold – vibraphone
Kameron Whalum – trombone
Marc Franklin – trumpet
Kirk Smothers – alto, bari sax
Lannie McMillan – tenor sax
Larry Gold – strings conduction, arrangement 
Emma Kummrow – violin
Luigi Mazzocchi – violin
Blake Espy – violin
Christopher Jusell – violin

Tess Varley – violin
Natasha Colkett – violin
Jonathan Kim – viola
Yoshihiko Nakano – viola
Glenn Fischbach – cello
Boo Mitchell – horns recording
Tobe Donohue – vocal recording of Bootsy Collins
Jens Jungkurth  – drums recording
Jeff Chestek – strings recording
Charles Moniz – recording, engineering
Alex Resoagli – engineering assistant
Serban Ghenea – mixing 
John Hanes – mixing engineering
Bryce Bordone – mixing assistant
Randy Merrill – mastering

Charts

Weekly charts

Year-end charts

Certifications

Release history

References

2021 songs
2021 singles
Silk Sonic songs
Anderson .Paak songs
Bruno Mars songs
Songs written by Anderson .Paak
Songs written by Bruno Mars
Songs written by D'Mile
Aftermath Entertainment singles
Atlantic Records singles